The German Film Award for Best Documentary Film is the award given to the best feature-length cinema documentary produced with majoritarian German funding. The current category was introduced in 2000, although numerous similar categories were in existence going back all the way to 1951.

As of 2020, besides the Lola statuette in gold, the winning film also receives 200.000 euros. A nomination is endowed with 100.00 euros. In 2012 the number of nominated films was raised from two to three.

List of winning films

External links
 Official list of all award recipients since 2005
 German Film Awards at the Internet Movie Database

Documentary
Documentary film awards
Awards established in 2000